Harry Douglas Yates (July 21, 1903 in Buffalo, Erie County, New York – October 9, 1996 in Menands, Albany County, New York) was an American banker and politician from New York. He was for a short time Acting New York State Comptroller in 1941.

Life
Yates was the son of Mary Theresa Duffy (1874-1956) and Harry Yates (1870-1956).He graduated B.S. from Hamilton College in 1925.

On April 27, 1932, he was appointed First Deputy Comptroller by Morris S. Tremaine. After Tremaine's death in office on October 12, 1941, Yates acted as Comptroller for a week until Governor Herbert H. Lehman appointed American Laborite Joseph V. O'Leary to fill the vacancy. Yates continued in office as First Deputy under O'Leary until November 1942 when he resigned to enter the U.S. Army and help with the war effort during World War II. He joined the Adjutant General's Corps stationed at Washington, D.C. While on leave in 1944, he married Anita Pohndorff (1914-1991) of Saratoga, New York.

He left the Army as a captain, and after his return to Albany, New York, managed the Dutch Village Apartments in Menands, NY, and became President of the Albany Home Savings Bank.

He was a trustee of Hamilton College, the Albany Institute of History and Art, and Siena College. He was awarded an honorary L.H.D. from Siena College in 1972, and the Distinguished Service Award from the Episcopal Bishop of Albany in 1973.

References
 Appointment, in NYT on April 28, 1932 (subscription required)
 Tremaine's funeral in NYT on October 14, 1941 (subscription required)
 Resigned and entered Army, in NYT on November 1942 (subscription required)
 The Pohndorff Yates Collection, at Skidmore College
 The Yates Gallery, at Siena College
 Bio at Hamilton College Library

1903 births
1996 deaths
New York State Comptrollers
Politicians from Buffalo, New York
United States Army officers
Hamilton College (New York) alumni
Politicians from Albany, New York
20th-century American politicians
People from Menands, New York
Businesspeople from Albany, New York
Businesspeople from Buffalo, New York
Military personnel from Buffalo, New York
20th-century American businesspeople